Wanli District  may refer to:

 Wanli District, Nanchang, district of Nanchang, Jiangxi, China
 Wanli District, New Taipei, a district in New Taipei, Taiwan